The 2020 Russian Indoor Athletics Championships was the 29th edition of the annual indoor track and field competition, which serves as the Russian national indoor championship for the sport. A total of 24 events (divided evenly between the sexes) were contested over three days from 13–15 February at the Alexander Gomelsky Universal Sports Hall CSKA in Moscow.

The Russian Ministry of Sport suspended the Russian Athletics Federation (RusAF) for one month on 31 January due ARAF officials obstructing in international anti-doping investigations into Danil Lysenko. As a result, RusAF did not organise the national championships and the Ministry of Sport managed this directly. Due to ongoing international sanctions for doping against the Russian governing body, the competition did not serve as a selection meet for the 2020 World Athletics Indoor Championships.

In addition to the main track and field championship, national championships for combined track and field events were held from 16–18 February in Kirov.

Results

Men

Women

Russian Combined Events Championships

Men

Women

References

Results
Результаты соревнования Чемпионат России в помещении 2020  . RusAthletics. Retrieved 2020-03-02.

External links
Official website for Russian Athletics

Russian Indoor Athletics Championships
Russian Indoor Athletics Championships
Russian Indoor Athletics Championships
Russian Indoor Athletics Championships
Sports competitions in Moscow
Athletics in Moscow